With Authority! was an online wrestling game created by Genetic Anomalies in conjunction with THQ and the World Wrestling Federation (WWF). It was the first WWF game released solely on home computers since 1992's WWF European Rampage Tour.

The game was released under its original title WWF With Authority! in 2001 on July 23. Later, in the summer of 2002, as a result of a lawsuit between the World Wildlife Fund and the World Wrestling Federation (which changed its name to World Wrestling Entertainment, or WWE, as a result) and, the game's official title became WWE With Authority!.

Gameplay
At its core, WWE With Authority! was a digital collectible card game in electronic form. Players could purchase virtual "Pages" and assemble them into a "Playbook." This playbook would represent the moves and abilities that your "Superstar" (wrestler) would be capable of pulling off in the ring. 

Most pages required "Momentum" to play. There were six different Momentum types that represented the different type of Pages that could be played. These Momentum types were called Agility, Technical, Strength, Strike, Knowledge, and Attitude. The first five of these momentum types could only be generated by momentum pages in playbooks. Attitude Momentum was a fluid resource that could be gained and lost by playing pages or utilizing a wrestler's special ability.

Wrestlers were given Momentum limits to limit which Pages Superstars had the ability to use. For example, the first edition Triple H Superstar had an Agility Momentum limit of 1. This meant that the player could only utilize one Agility Momentum in their Playbook, thus limiting the player from playing Pages that had a 2 or more Agility Momentum cost. 

In addition, Superstars had special abilities provide a benefit or penalty that generally increased the effectiveness of their respective movesets and/or Special Pages.

WWE With Authority! was distributed as a downloadable freeware game and was available on CD in retail stores for US$5.00. The retail version came with a redemption code for a William Regal starter playbook. Players could purchase additional pre-constructed playbooks for superstars consisting of complete selections of plays for US$10.00. Booster packs were also available for US$3.00 that include an assortment of random individual pages to accentuate your existing playbooks. A certain amount of rarer cards were guaranteed in each booster.

There is a single player mode, which is intended as a tutorial. The first edition tutorials were against the Mean Street Posse and narrated by Kevin Kelly, while the second edition tutorials were against Scotty 2 Hotty and narrated by Triple H. After the second edition, 3 computer opponents became available, with each opponent being a harder difficulty (X-Pac, then Triple H, and then The Big Show). The game was primarily geared towards the online multiplayer game, where as many as 1,000 people were available at any given time during the game's height. The game kept track of the player's wins, losses and draws, as well as the number of times a player has been cut off in the middle of a match. This feature was to discourage players from terminating the program to avoid taking a loss.

Expansion sets
There were seven sets put up for sale at various times during the tenure of the game.

Season One
First Edition, 196 cards (February 21, 2001)
This was the first set of the game. Established the framework and environment.

No Way Out, 145 cards (December 12, 2001)
This expansion rounded the game out to a complete play environment.

WrestleMania X8, 25 cards (late March, 2002)
This "mini-expansion" was on sale only for a month or two. It was developed during the show itself, with designers at the event taking notes then scrambling back to implement, code and test the set. The main theme was the inclusion of the NWO.

Season Two
TLC, 160 cards (May 16, 2002)
The "Tables, Ladders and Chairs" expansion greatly increased the number of hardcore and illegal moves and special cards available to players. Concurrent with this set was the release of the new "Ladder Match".

Second Edition, 250 cards (June 2002)
This set included 238 reprints from Season One and 12 Superstars. These Superstars were new versions of existing superstars, including new gameplay text. This update scheme received a mixed reaction.

SummerSlam 2002, 25 cards (August 2002)
Based on the results from the X8 mini-expansion, Genetic Anomalies released SummerSlam 2002. This set featured Shawn Michaels (returning from a four-year break from WWE) and Brock Lesnar (who captured his first WWE Championship).

Unforgiven, 200 cards (September 27, 2002)
This set marked the return to themes that were based more on card mechanics and less on storyline development.

"Expansion Eight", around 150 cards (unreleased)
Preview cards of this expansion set were released in October and November 2002. Rey Mysterio and Tajiri and their trademark moves were put on sale in Limited Edition form. This set was originally scheduled for a mid-December 2002 release.

Superstars

The following is a list of superstars that were in the game, and thus the playbooks were built around:

Al Snow
Booker T
Bradshaw
Brock Lesnar
Bubba Ray Dudley
Chris Benoit (2 editions)
Chris Jericho (3 editions)
Christian
D-Von Dudley
Eddie Guerrero (2 editions)
Edge (2 editions)
Goldust
Hollywood Hulk Hogan and Hulk Hogan
Jeff Hardy
Kane (2 editions)
Kevin Nash
Kurt Angle (2 editions)
Lance Storm
Lita (2 editions)
Matt Hardy
Rey Mysterio
Ric Flair
Rikishi Phatu
Rob Van Dam
Scott Hall
Scotty 2 Hotty
Shane McMahon
Shawn Michaels
Spike Dudley
Steve Blackman
Stone Cold
Tajiri
Tazz
Test
The Big Show (2 editions)
The Hurricane
The Rock (2 editions)
The Undertaker (2 editions)
Triple H (3 editions)
Trish Stratus
William Regal
X-Pac

Reception

WWE With Authority! was one of the first online collectible card games, along with Chron X, also from Genetic Anomalies. While subsequent online collectible card games have enjoyed success, including Magic: The Gathering Online, Genetic Anomalies would not survive to see the genre flourish. The game itself was met with mixed reception, as Metacritic gave it 53 out of 100.

There was also a WWF collectible card game released at about the same time entitled Raw Deal, which was considered to be a better alternative to the online version.

Shutdown and move to peer-to-peer

In January 2003, THQ ceased production of the game. The server remained online for several months. The freeware client can still be downloaded from some freeware distribution sites, but the game is no longer officially supported.

In 2003, just weeks before support ceased, a peer-to-peer version of the game was released by THQ such that existing players could continue using the game with the pages they purchased.  This way, players would connect though IP addresses. Eventually, the new community was named With Authority! Peer-2-Peer. This version of the game used mIRC for a chat room/server, and the original With Authority! client as before. In addition, instead of relying on old purchased pages, guide sets were released, which consisted of every page released for the game, thus giving the option to build practically any deck. The community shut down years later.

See also

List of licensed wrestling video games
List of fighting games

References

External links

Artwork and screenshots
Archived Website
Www.synamicd.com

2001 video games
Card games introduced in 2001
Digital collectible card games
Windows games
Windows-only games
WWE video games
North America-exclusive video games
THQ games
Inactive massively multiplayer online games
Professional wrestling games
Video games developed in the United States